Jayden Martin (born 7 November 2002) is an Antiguan professional footballer who plays for the Antigua and Barbuda national football team.

Career statistics

International

References

External links
 

2002 births
Living people
Antigua and Barbuda footballers
Antigua and Barbuda international footballers
Association football goalkeepers
Five Islands F.C. players